Amanita kotohiraensis is a species of highly poisonous mushroom in the family Amanitaceae native to eastern Asia.

A review of cases in southern China finding it had been responsible for the poisoning of 91 people, 1 of whom died, between 1994 and 2012.

References

kotohiraensis
Fungi of Japan
Fungi of China
Fungi described in 2000